The Dakota National Forest was a national forest established in North Dakota by the U.S. Forest Service on November 24, 1908 with  near Ranger as an experimental forest.  On July 30, 1917 it was abolished.

References

External links
Forest History Society
Listing of the National Forests of the United States and Their Dates (from Forest History Society website) Text from Davis, Richard C., ed. Encyclopedia of American Forest and Conservation History. New York: Macmillan Publishing Company for the Forest History Society, 1983. Vol. II, pp. 743-788.

Former National Forests of the United States